Robert William Matthews (16 April 1897 – 18 December 1987) was a Welsh footballer who played as a centre-half for Liverpool Football Club in the early 1920s and earned three caps for Wales. During World War I, he took part in the Battle of the Somme, in France.

Williams also played in The Football League for Bristol City, Wrexham, Barrow, Bradford Park Avenue, Stockport County and Chester. His non-league clubs included Northwich Victoria, Oswestry Town, Witton Albion, Sandbach Ramblers, Colwyn Bay and Rossendale United

Later career
Following his retirement from football, Matthews turned to coaching and had a spell as manager of Llangollen. He later became a scout for Blackpool and discovered Glyn James.

Matthews was also a keen cyclist well into his late 70s.

References

External links
Liverpool FC history profile
Article on players to play for Chester and Liverpool (see Billy Matthews)

1897 births
1987 deaths
People from Ruabon
Sportspeople from Wrexham County Borough
Welsh footballers
Wales international footballers
Liverpool F.C. players
Chester City F.C. players
Wrexham A.F.C. players
Bristol City F.C. players
Colwyn Bay F.C. players
New Brighton A.F.C. players
Northwich Victoria F.C. players
Barrow A.F.C. players
Stockport County F.C. players
Bradford (Park Avenue) A.F.C. players
Oswestry Town F.C. players
Witton Albion F.C. players
Rossendale United F.C. players
English Football League players
Association football defenders
Sandbach Ramblers F.C. players
British military personnel of World War I